The Los Angeles Tennis Center is a tennis facility located on the campus of the University of California, Los Angeles in Westwood, Los Angeles, California.  The center opened May 20, 1984, and hosted the demonstration tennis event of the 1984 Summer Olympics.  The UCLA Bruins tennis teams moved to the facility in 1985 (men) and 1997 (women).  The NCAA Women's Tennis Championships were held at the LATC in 1984, 1987, and 1988, and the Men's Championships took place there in 1997.

The center hosted the Los Angeles Open, an ATP World Tour 250 event.  The main grandstand surrounds three courts, and has a capacity of 5800 spectators. There are eight lighted, hard-surface courts at the center, which can hold 10,000 spectators. The Straus Stadium was named for Leonard Straus, the former chairman of Thrifty Drugs; the Center court was called the Times-Mirror Center Court; the drawboard was named for Johnny Carson; and the scoreboard was named Union 76 Scoreboard.

The Center hosted for many years the annual "Spring Sing", UCLA's student talent show and the presentation of the George and Ira Gershwin Award. Winners included Angela Lansbury (1988), Ella Fitzgerald (1989), Ray Charles (1991), Debbie Allen (1992), Mel Torme (1994), Bernadette Peters (1995), Frank Sinatra (2000), Stevie Wonder (2002), k.d. lang (2003), James Taylor (2004), Burt Bacharach (2006), Quincy Jones (2007), Lionel Richie (2008), Julie Andrews (2009) and Brian Wilson (2011).

For many years, graduation ceremonies and celebrations were also held at the Los Angeles Tennis Center.

The Center hosted the 1997 Beach Volleyball World Championships, MTV Rock N' Jock, and the 2011 Coldplay concert. Presidential candidate Ron Paul spoke at the center before a large crowd on April 4, 2012. The 2015 JazzReggae Festival @ UCLA will be held at the Tennis Center on April 25, 2015.

The Southern California Tennis Association (SCTA) has offices at the Los Angeles Tennis Center.

Gallery

See also
 List of tennis stadiums by capacity

References

External links 
UCLA Bruins.com
Los Angeles Tennis Center, imagine Olympic 1984

College tennis venues in the United States
Tennis venues in Los Angeles
UCLA Bruins tennis
Westwood, Los Angeles
Venues of the 1984 Summer Olympics
Olympic tennis venues